Lipoptena is a genus of Hippoboscidae, known as louse flies or keds.

Systematics
Genus Lipoptena Nitzsch, 1818
Species group 'a'
L. axis Maa, 1969
L. cervi (Linnaeus, 1758)
L. efovea Speiser, 1905
L. fortisetosa Maa, 1965
L. japonica Bequaert, 1942
L. nirvana Maa, 1969
L. pauciseta Edwards, 1919
L. rusaecola Bequaert, 1942
L. saepes Maa, 1969
L. sigma Maa, 1965
L. timida Maa, 1969
Species group 'b'
L. pteropi Denny, 1843
Species group 'c'
L. arianae Maa, 1969
L. capreoli Rondani, 1878
L. chalcomleaena Speiser, 1904
L. couturieri Séguy, 1935
L. grahami Bequaert, 1942
L. saltatrix Maa, 1969
L. weidneri Maa, 1969
Species group 'd'
L. binoculus (Speiser, 1908)
L. hopkinsi Bequaert, 1942
L. iniqua Maa, 1969
L. paradoxa Newstead, 1907
L. sepiacea Speiser, 1905
Species group 'e'
L. depressa depressa (Say, 1823)
L. depressa pacifica Maa, 1969
L. guimaraesi Bequaert, 1957
L. mazamae Rondani, 1878
Incertae sedis
L. doszhanovi Grunin, 1974
L. pudui Peterson & Maa, 1970
L. sikae Mogi, 1975

References 

 
 

Parasitic flies
Hippoboscidae
Hippoboscoidea genera
Taxa named by Christian Ludwig Nitzsch